Ya'akov "Kobi" Dajani (born 5 November 1984) is an Israeli professional association football player and former Israel U21 international who is currently contracted to Hapoel Marmorek.

Biography

Early life 
Kobi Dajani started playing football in the youth ranks of Gadna Tel Aviv Yehuda in Tel Aviv.

Playing career

Domestic 
Dajani made his first team debut, as a substitute, for Bnei Yehuda in a Premier League match against city rivals, Hapoel on 19 October 2002.

During a training session on 6 October 2009, Dajani got into a heated war of words with youth player, Raphael Maltinsky. After some physical play, Dajani walked over to Maltinsky and headbutted him in the face requiring Maltinsky to be taken to a hospital where he had four stitches put in. Dajani apologized that night to Maltinsky over the phone. The following day, both Dajani and Maltinsky came to training but both were not allowed to train with the club without going before a tribunal.

In June 2010 Dajani signed a 1-year deal with Maccabi Netanya. His debut season with the club proved to be his finest and he is considered by many fans as the MVP of Netanya in the 2010–11 season.
In June 2011 he signed a new 4-years contract with Netanya worth $480,000 which means a 60% upgrade to his yearly salary.

International 
Dajani was part of the Israel national under-21 football team that qualified for the 2007 UEFA European Under-21 Football Championship, but was not named to the final squad.

On 17 November 2010 he made his debut for the senior side when Israel played against Iceland.

Statistics 
 As to 1 June 2014

Honours

Team
Liga Leumit:
Runner-up (1): 2009–10

Individual
Israeli Premier League 2010–11 Surprise of the Season

References

External links 
 
 Profile on One.co.il 

1984 births
Living people
Israeli footballers
Association football midfielders
Gadna Tel Aviv Yehuda F.C. players
Bnei Yehuda Tel Aviv F.C. players
F.C. Ashdod players
Hapoel Petah Tikva F.C. players
Maccabi Netanya F.C. players
Hapoel Be'er Sheva F.C. players
Hapoel Haifa F.C. players
Hapoel Marmorek F.C. players
Israel under-21 international footballers
Israeli Premier League players
Liga Leumit players
Footballers from Jaffa